Tabar Kalayeh (also Romanized as Tabar Kalāyeh; also known as Tabar Kalā-ye Gelrūdbār and Tabar Kalā-ye Kalrūdbār) is a village in Baz Kia Gurab Rural District, in the Central District of Lahijan County, Gilan Province, Iran. At the 2006 census, its population was 209, in 69 families.

References 

Populated places in Lahijan County